Drago Hmelina (1932–2004) was a Croatian footballer.

Club career
Nicknamed "Beli", Hmelina started playing in Metalac Zagreb and in 1950 he signed with NK Lokomotiva Zagreb where he played until his military service, in 1952. Afterward, he plays with Belgrade's FK Partizan between 1954 and 1956 before returning in 1957 to Lokomotiva. In 1958 he moves to the great NK Dinamo Zagreb and after a year he moves to NK Čelik Zenica following a season with FK Sarajevo, in 1960. He will end up his career playing again with Lokomotiva between 1961 and 1963. He usually played as a left winger and was known for his good technical skills and as an excellent dribbler.

External links
 Career story at Nogometni Leksikon

1932 births
2004 deaths
Footballers from Zagreb
Association football wingers
Yugoslav footballers
NK Lokomotiva Zagreb players
FK Partizan players
GNK Dinamo Zagreb players
NK Čelik Zenica players
FK Sarajevo players
Yugoslav First League players